The World Outside may refer to:

 The World Outside (The MacDonald Brothers album), 2007
 The World Outside (Eyes Set to Kill album), 2009
 World Outside, an album by the Psychedelic Furs, 1991